Turkish organised crime in Great Britain has been prevalent in the country since the early 90s when the Arifs controlled London's underworld for a brief time. Since the fall of the Taliban during the 2001 invasion of Afghanistan, it has been speculated that the lifting of the ban on opium cultivation may become a highly lucrative trade for  Turkish criminal organisations who already control the smuggling and distribution of heroin. 

However, while concerned over the importation of cheap heroin due to Afghanistan's resumption of growing poppies, the National Criminal Intelligence Service and British police officials publicly announced that is unlikely as the street price of heroin for the last several years has remained relatively stable at £40 a gram.

External links 
War on terrorism: Supply - Almost all routes lead back to Afghanistan by Ian Burrell - The Independent  

Organised crime groups in the United Kingdom
British people of Turkish descent